Cervalces carnutorum, sometimes known as Alces carnutorum, is an extinct species of large deer that lived in Europe during the Early Pleistocene. Fragments were found in the site of Saint-Prest, near Chartres, and described by Laugel in 1862. 

The exact position of species within the genera Alces, Cervalces and Libralces is of debate. Many large, prehistoric moose-like cervids were originally placed in Alces, but  have since been moved to Cervalces or Libralces by many (but not all) authorities. Both Cervalces and Libralces have also been used interchangeably with regards to certain species.

References

External links 
 zipcodezoo

Cervalces
Prehistoric deer
Pleistocene even-toed ungulates
Prehistoric mammals of Europe
Fossil taxa described in 1862